The Palmyra Area School District is the public school system in southwest Lebanon County, Pennsylvania.

The District serves the residents of Palmyra Borough, North Londonderry Township, South Londonderry Township, Campbelltown, Lawn, and Mount Gretna. According to 2008 local census data, it serves a resident population of 20,487. By 2010, the District's population increased to 22,399 people. In 2009, the Palmyra Area School District residents’ per capita income was $24,082, while the median family income was $58,016. In the Commonwealth, the median family income was $49,501 and the United States median family income was $49,445, in 2010.

Palmyra Area School District consists of:
 Palmyra Area High School
 Palmyra Area Middle School
 Forge Road Elementary School
 Pine Street Elementary School
 Northside Elementary School
Lingle Avenue Elementary School

Extracurriculars
The schools offer a variety of clubs, activities and an extensive sports program.

Sports
The District funds:

Boys
Baseball - AAA
Basketball- AAA
Cross Country - AA
Football - AAAAA
Golf - AAA
Lacrosse - AAAA
Soccer - AAA
Swimming and Diving - AA
Tennis - AA
Track and Field - AAA
 Wrestling	 - AAA

Girls
Basketball - AAA
Cross Country - AA
Field Hockey - AA
Golf - AAA
Lacrosse - AAAA
Soccer (Fall) - AAA
Softball - AAA
Swimming and Diving - AA
Girls' Tennis - AAA
Track and Field - AAA
Volleyball AAA

Junior high school sports

Boys
Basketball
Cross Country
Football
Soccer
Track and Field
Wrestling	

Girls
Basketball
Cross Country
Field Hockey
Track and Field

According to PIAA directory July 2012

References

School districts in Lebanon County, Pennsylvania